William Finbar O'Sullivan (born 5 October 1959) is an English former professional footballer who played in the Football League as a midfielder. He also played non-league football for clubs including Dartford, Gravesend & Northfleet, Fisher Athletic, Dover Athletic, Crawley Town, Dulwich Hamlet, Bromley and Margate. He represented the Republic of Ireland at youth level.

References

1959 births
Living people
English footballers
Association football midfielders
Footballers from Lambeth
Republic of Ireland youth international footballers
Charlton Athletic F.C. players
Dartford F.C. players
Ebbsfleet United F.C. players
Fisher Athletic F.C. players
Dover Athletic F.C. players
Crawley Town F.C. players
Dulwich Hamlet F.C. players
Bromley F.C. players
Margate F.C. players
English Football League players
National League (English football) players